Erythrina lysistemon is a species of deciduous tree in the pea family, Fabaceae, that is native to South Africa. Common names include common coral-tree, lucky bean tree, umsintsi (Xhosa), muvhale (Venda), mophete (Tswana), koraalboom of kanniedood (Afrikaans), mokhungwane (Sotho) and umsinsi (Zulu). It is regularly cultivated as a tree for gardens and parks.

Description
The tree is leafless for up to 4 or 5 months of the year. The lovely scarlet red flowers are borne in dense racemes in spring before leaves and attract numerous birds and insects to the garden. It is hardy to USDA Zone 9b.

References

External links

https://pza.sanbi.org/erythrina-lysistemon

lysistemon
Trees of South Africa
Medicinal plants of Africa
Ornamental trees
Poisonous plants